Concord is a historic home located in District Heights, Prince George's County, Maryland. It is a 1790s -story Flemish bond brick house with a five-bay south facade, and a later two-part wing which stretches to the west. The home was built for Zachariah Berry, Sr. (1749-1845), a prosperous planter who had large landholdings in Maryland, the District of Columbia, and Kentucky. A great deal of the home's features are Greek Revival-influenced, dating from an 1860s renovation. A family cemetery and a number of 20th century outbuildings are located on the property.

Concord was listed on the National Register of Historic Places in 1982.

References

External links
, including photo in 1974, at Maryland Historical Trust website

Historic American Buildings Survey in Maryland
Houses completed in 1797
Houses in Prince George's County, Maryland
Houses on the National Register of Historic Places in Maryland
Federal architecture in Maryland
National Register of Historic Places in Prince George's County, Maryland